This is a list of symbols appearing on Japanese maps. These symbols are called  in the Japanese language.

Partial list of symbols for users with visual impairment 
Official symbols according to the conventions of the Geographical Survey Institute of Japan appear with a circle below.

See also
 
 
  (GSI)

External links

 Japanese map symbols
 
  This is a very good reference, it has separate links for each symbol.
 
 

Japanese map
Maps of Japan
Geography of Japan
Japan